Malcolm B Malcolm (12 December 1912 – 19 January 1982) was an Indian cyclist. He was five times National Cycling Champion and competed for India in the at the 1948_Summer Olympics  in the  Men's individual road race, the Asian Games 1951 and the World Championships in 1954. 

He was also father of 1962, 64, 67,71 national cycling champion Bapoo Malcolm and of Shirin Malcolm (Mistry).

References

External links
 

1912 births
1982 deaths
Sportspeople from Mumbai
Indian male cyclists
Olympic cyclists of India
Cyclists at the 1948 Summer Olympics